The 300s decade ran from January 1, 300, to December 31, 309.

East Asia
In Yamato (Japan), the Kofun period dominated during this decade. It was an animistic culture which existed prior the introduction of Buddhism. A legend of the 4th century Prince Yamato Takeru alludes to the borders of the Yamato and battlegrounds in the area. A frontier was obviously somewhere close to the later Izumo province (the eastern part of today's Shimane Prefecture). Another frontier, in Kyūshū, was apparently somewhere north of today's Kumamoto prefecture. The legend specifically states that there was an eastern land in Honshū "whose people disobeyed the imperial court", against whom Yamato Takeru was sent to fight. That rivalling country may have been located rather close to the Yamato nucleus area itself, or relatively far away. The today Kai province is mentioned as one of the locations where prince Yamato Takeru sojourned in his said military expedition.

Northern frontier of this age was also explained in Kojiki as the legend of Shido Shōgun's (四道将軍: Shōguns to four ways) expedition. Out of four shōguns, Ōbiko set northward to Koshi and his son Take Nunakawawake set to eastern states. The father moved east from northern Koshi while the son moved north on his way, and they finally met at Aizu (current western Fukushima). Although the legend itself is not likely to be a historical fact, Aizu is rather close to southern Tōhoku, where the north end of keyhole kofun culture as of late 4th century is located.

Significant people

References